Gino Lori (born 3 January 1956) is an Italian former cyclist. He competed in the team time trial event at the 1976 Summer Olympics.

References

External links
 

1956 births
Living people
Italian male cyclists
Olympic cyclists of Italy
Cyclists at the 1976 Summer Olympics
Sportspeople from Parma
Cyclists from Emilia-Romagna
20th-century Italian people